Furca (Latin for "fork") is an extinct genus of marrellomorph arthropod known from the Sandbian stage (upper Ordovician period) of the Czech Republic, with a single currently described species, Furca bohemica. A tentative additional species, "Furca mauretanica": was proposed for specimens discovered in Morocco, but this species remains a nomen nudum until formally published, and probably belongs in a new separate genus.

Description
Furca is characterized by a broad head shield with three pairs of prominent spines: front (anterolateral), side (mediolateral) and rear (posterolateral). The mediolateral spines are long and strongly curved. Appendages are unknown from fossils.

Paleobiology
Furca fossils have been found in sediments indicative of shallow marine habitats.  Since appendages and other body parts are unknown, no firm conclusions can be made of the biology of Furca. However, comparisons to other marrellomorphs and living arthropods such as horseshoe crabs suggest a benthic marine lifestyle: dwelling on the sea floor.

Classification

With its unusual anatomy, Furca has a colorful taxonomic history. The first specimens were discovered by Joachim Barrande, who named them Furca bohemica (Latin for "Bohemian fork") but did not formally publish descriptions. The specimens were not illustrated until 1847, when they were interpreted as the hypostome of the trilobite Prionocheilus. Antonin Fritsch was the first to formally describe Furca as a distinct taxon, interpreting F. bohemica as a larval echinoderm in 1908.<ref name=Fritsch1908a>Fritsch, A. 1908. Problematica silurica. In: J. Barrande (ed.), Système silurien du centre de la Bohême. 28 pp. Bellman, Prague</ref> In 1919, F. bohemica was, for the first time, interpreted as an arthropod. A second species, F. pilosa was described in 1999, as well as an unnamed species simply called "Furca sp.". In 2013, Rak and colleagues suggested that F. pilosa and all previously named species were synonyms of Furca bohemica.

A tentative additional species, "F." mauretanica from the Floian stage Fezouata Formation of Morocco, was proposed in a doctoral thesis in 2006 and subsequently referred to as "probably belonging to the genus Furca". However, the name has yet to be formally published and so remains a nomen nudum. Phylogenetic analyses have recovered it as distinct marrelid taxon not closely related to Furca bohemica, and thus probably should be placed in a separate genus.Furca bohemica is assigned to the marrellomorph clade Marrellida. While historicaly placed in Mimetasteridae alongside Mimetaster'', other studies have disputed this placement.

References

Marrellomorpha
Prehistoric arthropod genera
Fossils of the Czech Republic
Letná Formation
Ordovician arthropods
Fezouata Formation fossils
Fossil taxa described in 1908
Ordovician genus extinctions